The Winnebago River Bridge was a historic structure located north of Mason City, Iowa, United States. This is the second span at this location. The stone abutments from the previous bridge were utilized in this one. They were sheathed in concrete by the Concrete Engineering Company, and William Henkel of Mason City constructed the bridge. It is composed of three concrete spans with a  center span cantilevered from shorter anchor spans. It was listed on the National Register of Historic Places in 1998. A second span has subsequently been built to the east in 1969.

The bridge was replaced in 2009.

See also

List of bridges documented by the Historic American Engineering Record in Iowa
List of bridges on the National Register of Historic Places in Iowa
National Register of Historic Places listings in Cerro Gordo County, Iowa

References

External links

Bridges completed in 1926
Bridges in Cerro Gordo County, Iowa
Historic American Engineering Record in Iowa
National Register of Historic Places in Cerro Gordo County, Iowa
Road bridges on the National Register of Historic Places in Iowa
U.S. Route 65
Bridges of the United States Numbered Highway System
Concrete bridges in the United States
Cantilever bridges in the United States
Girder bridges in the United States